The Henderson House is a historic house at 1510 South Ringo Street in Little Rock, Arkansas.  It is a two-story wood-frame structure with Craftsman styling, built in 1925 for Benjamin D. Henderson.  Henderson was a prominent figure in Little Rock's African-American community, holding positions of importance in the Mosaic Templars of America, an African-American Masonic society.  It is one of the finer houses in the Dunbar School neighborhood, a historically African-American area.

The house was listed on the National Register of Historic Places in 1999.

See also
National Register of Historic Places listings in Little Rock, Arkansas

References

Houses on the National Register of Historic Places in Arkansas
Houses completed in 1925
Houses in Little Rock, Arkansas
National Register of Historic Places in Little Rock, Arkansas